Jean Michel Schlumberger (June 24, 1907 – August 29, 1987) was a French jewelry designer especially well known for his work at Tiffany & Co.

Family and early life
Schlumberger was born in then-German Mulhouse, France, to a well-to-do family involved in textile manufacturing. His father was Paul Albert Edouard Schlumberger (1877-1952) and his mother was Elisabeth Schoen (1884-1942). He had four siblings; Daniel Schlumberger (1904-1972), Pascal Alfred (1911-1986), Isabelle Françoise Elisabeth and Jacqueline. He sketched constantly during his youth, but his parents tried to discourage his artistic interest by refusing to allow him to undertake formal training.
 
Schlumberger began his career creating buttons for Elsa Schiaparelli in the 1930s. Schiaparelli later commissioned him to design costume jewelry for her firm.
During World War II, Schlumberger was in the French Army and survived the Battle of Dunkirk. He also served under General Charles de Gaulle in England and the Middle East with the Free French Forces.

After the war, Schlumberger came to New York and began to design clothing for Chez Ninon. In 1946, he opened a jewelry salon with his business partner Nicolas Bongard (1908–2000). Also, during the war Schlumberger met Lucien “Luc” Bouchage, a talented photographer and kindred spirit who would become his life partner.

Career at Tiffany & Co.

In 1956, the president of Tiffany & Co., Walter Hoving, asked Schlumberger to begin designing for the firm. He had his own workshop at the company until his retirement in the late 1970s and was eventually made a Vice-President.

Schlumberger's designs at Tiffany & Co. were known for their whimsical interpretations of natural forms. He was especially inspired by sea creatures and other animals. Diana Vreeland wrote that Schlumberger "appreciates the miracle of jewels. For him, they are the ways and means to the realization of his dreams."

He quickly built an impressive client base that included the Duchess of Windsor, Babe Paley, Greta Garbo, Mona von Bismarck, Rachel Lambert Mellon, Jayne Wrightsman, C.Z. Guest,  Gloria Guinness, Françoise de Langlade,  Princess Marina, Duchess of Kent, Lyn Revson, Gloria Vanderbilt,  Elizabeth Taylor and Audrey Hepburn.

For his wife, Jacqueline, John F. Kennedy purchased the Two Fruit clip in rubies and diamonds, which is in the permanent collection of the John F. Kennedy Presidential Library and Museum. Jacqueline Kennedy wore so many of Schlumberger's bracelets that the press dubbed them "Jackie bracelets".

Schlumberger remains one of only four jewelers that Tiffany & Co. has allowed to sign their work: the others are Paloma Picasso, Elsa Peretti and Frank Gehry.

Schlumberger was a very private person but liked to socialize among friends like Cristóbal Balenciaga, Emilio Terry, Diana Vreeland and Hubert de Givenchy.

Schlumberger died in Paris aged 80 and is buried at Isola di San Michele.

Tiffany Yellow Diamond
One of the most famous pieces that Schlumberger created was the mounting for the famed Tiffany Diamond, which was in the firm's collection since the nineteenth century. The brooch, entitled "Bird on a Rock", incorporates the impressive  yellow diamond in a fanciful setting typical of Schlumberger's 
style.

Awards
He was the first jewelry designer to win the coveted Fashion Critics’ Coty Award in 1958. In 1977, the French Government made him a Knight / Chevalier of Ordre national du Mérite.

References

Further reading

Books
Bizot, Chantal, de Gary, Marie-Noël, Possémé, Évelyne and preface by David-Weill, Hélène, The Jewels of Jean Schlumberger, Harry N. Abrams, 2001.
Hue-Williams, Sarah, Christie's Guide to Jewellery, Assouline, 2001.
Loring, John, Tiffany’s 20th Century: A Portrait of American Style, Harry N. Abrams, 1997.
Loring, John, Tiffany in Fashion, Harry N. Abrams, 2003.
Loring, John, Tiffany Flora & Fauna, Harry N. Abrams, 2003.
Phillips, Clare, Bejewelled by Tiffany 1837-1987, Art Institute of Chicago, 2006.
Mirabella, Grace, Tiffany & Co., Thames and Hudson, 1997.
Taylor, Elizabeth, Elizabeth Taylor: My Love Affair with Jewelry, Simon & Schuster, 2002.
Vreeland, Diana, Jean Schlumberger, Franco Maria Ricci, 1976.

External links

Voguepedia - Designers - Jean Schlumberger 

French jewellery designers
Artists from Mulhouse
1907 births
French Army personnel of World War II
1987 deaths
Burials at Isola di San Michele
Tiffany & Co.
Free French military personnel of World War II
LGBT designers
French gay artists
Gay military personnel
20th-century French LGBT people